Crown Peak is an ice-covered peak,  high, topped by a conspicuous crown-shaped ice formation. It forms the highest summit and the south end of the Marescot Ridge on the northwest side of the Trinity Peninsula. It was named by the Falkland Islands Dependencies Survey following their survey of the area in 1946.

Map
 Trinity Peninsula. Scale 1:250000 topographic map No. 5697. Institut für Angewandte Geodäsie and British Antarctic Survey, 1996.

References 

Mountains of Trinity Peninsula